The 1987 Argentine motorcycle Grand Prix was the last round of the 1987 Grand Prix motorcycle racing season. It took place on 4 October 1987 at the Autódromo Oscar Alfredo Gálvez.

Classification

500 cc

References

Argentine Republic motorcycle Grand Prix
Argentine
Motorcycle Grand Prix